Valentina Vostok is a fictional character by DC Comics. She first appeared in Showcase #94 (August 1977), and was created by Paul Kupperberg and Joe Staton.

In live-action, Valentina Vostok made her debut in the first season of the CW Arrowverse series Legends of Tomorrow, played by Stephanie Corneliussen. Mariana Klaveno portrayed the character in the second season of the DC Universe/HBO Max series Doom Patrol.

Fictional character biography
Lt. Col. Valentina Vostok of the Soviet Air Force stole an experimental Russian fighter plane in order to defect to the United States. The plane malfunctioned en route and she crash-landed at the spot where the original Doom Patrol had apparently perished and was fused with the negative energy being which formerly inhabited the body of the Patrol's Negative Man. However, instead of being able to send it out from her body under her control, Vostok gained the ability to transform herself into such a being. Years later, it was revealed by Doom Patrol villain the Brain that Niles Caulder, founder of the Doom Patrol, manipulated Valentina's transformation into a superhero in order to create a replacement for presumed dead Negative Man.

Assuming the name Negative Woman, Valentina defected to the United States and became a member of the second incarnation of Doom Patrol for several years. Valentina became romantically involved with teammate Joshua Clay, aka Tempest, but broke off the relationship due to the nature of her powers changing to match that of her predecessor: her body became permanently radioactive, requiring her to constantly wear radiation-blocking bandages over all of her body, and the energy being would emerge from her under her mental command.

Ultimately, when Negative Man was found alive and rescued by the new Doom Patrol, the negative energy abandoned Valentina and was returned to Larry Trainor. Though she was initially furious at having lost her power and being replaced by Negative Man, his ultimate rejection of the power allowed for Valentina to leave the Doom Patrol on good terms, unaware of the fact that the negative energy being would ultimately return and claim Trainor again, turning him into Rebis.

Valentina would go on to work for the American secret services, being involved in a number of US government departments including serving for a time as head of the Agency and working for the original incarnation of Checkmate.

White Queen
Vostok was later named White Queen of the current incarnation of Checkmate, replacing Amanda Waller.

Final Crisis
A Negative Woman was among those in the Blüdhaven Strike Force in Final Crisis #4 sent by Checkmate. Included are Count Vertigo and Atomic Knights. Vostok is seen under Darkseid's control in Final Crisis: Resist.

Blackest Night
Valentina was apparently killed during the events of Final Crisis, as her corpse is reanimated as a member of the undead Black Lantern Corps during the Doom Patrol series' Blackest Night tie-in storyline. She attacks Larry Trainor, using a corrupted version of the Negative creature (whether this is a construct created by her black power ring, or a revival of her former powers, is not made clear). Trainor absorbs both Negative Creatures, taking control and sending both of them into Valentina. This causes her body to overload and explode, destroying the black ring.

The New 52 & DC Rebirth 
In The New 52 reboot (2011), Negative Woman first appears in Justice League (vol. 2) #24 in a camera being watched by Grid, and is seen again in Justice League (vol. 2) #27 where she was seemingly killed off by Johnny Quick and Atomica.

Powers and abilities
As the Negative Woman, Valentina formerly possesses a radioactive "soul-self", and was capable of flight, intangibility, and generate minor explosions upon contact with positive energy. As the White Queen, she currently has mastery of military protocol.

In other media
 Valentina Vostok appears in the Legends of Tomorrow episodes "White Knights" and "Fail-Safe", portrayed by Stephanie Corneliussen. This version is a Soviet scientist from 1986 who was employed by Vandal Savage to develop a composite "nuclear man" after the latter witnessed Firestorm a decade previously. Savage and Vostok capture half of Firestorm, Dr. Martin Stein, and torture his allies to force him to divulge the F.I.R.E.S.T.O.R.M. matrix's secrets. After Vostok discovers Stein has part of it, she forces him to merge with her despite his warnings of requiring a "quantum splicer" to stabilize the fusion process. Stein's partner, Jefferson Jackson, encourages him to fight Vostok's control, giving Jackson time to break Stein free and escape with him while Vostok loses control of the matrix and releases the energy in a nuclear explosion, though her fate following this is unknown.
 Valentina Vostok / Negative Woman appears in the Young Justice: Outsiders episode "Nightmare Monkeys", voiced by Tara Strong. This version was a member of the Doom Patrol before she and most of her team were killed while on a mission years prior to the series.
 Valentina Vostok, also known as "Moscow", appears in the Doom Patrol episode "Space Patrol", portrayed by Mariana Klaveno. This version is a member of the Pioneers of the Uncharted, a research team sent into space by the Chief in 1955 to find a source of time-dilating power. Her teammates Zip and Spec perished during the mission, but Vostok made contact with the source, which she discovered is a negative energy entity that inhabits her body. Over 60 years later, the now ageless Vostok returns to Earth so she can use the planet's atmosphere to kill alien spores that reanimated Zip and Spec's bodies. This leads to a personal conversation between herself and Larry Trainor over their experiences with their respective negative energy entities and how they impacted their lives. She invites him to join her in returning to space once she finishes severing her ties to Earth, but Trainor declines in favor of repairing his relationship with his family.

See also
List of Russian superheroes

References

External links
Negative Woman at DC Database
Valentina Vostok at Comic VIne

Characters created by Paul Kupperberg
Comics characters introduced in 1977
Doom Patrol
DC Comics female superheroes
DC Comics metahumans
DC Comics superheroes
Fictional immigrants to the United States
Fictional aviators
Fictional Soviet Air Force personnel
Fictional Russian people
Fictional Soviet people
Russian superheroes
Fictional fighter pilots
Fictional lieutenant colonels